Christabel Marguerite Alain Chamarette, sometimes Christabel Bridge (born 1 May 1948) was a Greens Senator for Western Australia from 1992 to 1996.

Personal life
Born in Hyderabad, India in 1948, Chamarette is of Anglo-Indian and French Huguenot ancestry. She has worked as a community worker in Bangladesh and later as a clinical psychologist at Fremantle Prison.

Politics
Chamarette was appointed to the Senate in 1992, following the resignation of Jo Vallentine. She was opposed to privatising Telstra and delayed the Mabo legislation by demanding the inclusion of mineral rights in the compensation package for native title holders.

She was defeated at the 1996 general election; her term ending several months later on 30 June 1996. Chamarette said that when working in the Senate, she thought it was the most important work of her life, but she now refers to it as simply "useful experience".

After politics
She was an expert consultant to the Department of Justice and was appointed to the Western Australian parole board in 2002. She was one of four members who resigned in 2005 in protest against the State Government's response to the Mahoney inquiry.

References

1948 births
Living people
Greens Western Australia members of the Parliament of Australia
Indian emigrants to Australia
Members of the Australian Senate
Members of the Australian Senate for Western Australia
Australian people of Anglo-Indian descent
Australian people of French descent
Anglican pacifists
Australian Anglicans
Women members of the Australian Senate
20th-century Australian politicians
20th-century Australian women politicians